V 307 Württemberg was a German fishing trawler that was requisitioned in the Second World War for use as a vorpostenboot. She was built in 1929 as Hans Wriedt and was renamed in 1934. She was returned to her owners post-war and was scrapped in 1957.

Description
The engine was made by Deschimag Seebeckwerft, Wesermünde. It was rated at 89nhp. The engine powered a single screw propeller driven via a geared low pressure turbine, double reduction gearing and a hydraulic coupling.

History
Hans Wriedt was built as yard number 506 by J. Frerichs & Co, AG., Einswarden, Germany for the Nordsee Deutsche Hochseefischerei Bremen-Cuxhaven AG. She was launched on 26 November 1929 and completed on 19 January 1930. The Code Letters QVNG were allocated, as was the fishing boat registration ON 119. On 21 February 1932 the German fishing trawler  was driven ashore at "Leiknes Gisund", Norway. Hans Wriedt and Lappland went to her assistance. On 29 April 1933, she was renamed Württemberg. On 17 October 1934 her registration was changed to PG 479. In 1934, her Code Letters were changed to DNNZ.

On 25 September 1939, Württemberg was requistioned by the Kriegsmarine for use as a Vorpostenboot. She was allocated to 3 Vorpostenflotille as V 307 ''Württemberg. She survived the war and was returned to her owners on 18 August 1945. She was scrapped in July 1957 by W. Ritscher, Hamburg, West Germany.

References

Sources

1929 ships
Ships built in Bremen (state)
Fishing vessels of Germany
Steamships of Germany
World War II merchant ships of Germany
Auxiliary ships of the Kriegsmarine
Steamships of West Germany
Fishing vessels of West Germany